Baek Jong-yul (born 1970), known as Baik, is a South Korean film director. Baik worked as a visual artist and advertisement director before entering the film industry. His feature debut - a romantic comedy film The Beauty Inside (2015), deals with the love between a man who becomes a different person every day and a girl (played by Han Hyo-joo), who loves him. Baik said that there were definitely challenges to create a film with so many different actors playing the same character as each actor came to the set with his or her own interpretation of the character. His effort won him the Best New Director at the 52nd Grand Bell Awards in 2015.

Filmography

Film 
Oldboy (2003) - production dept
S Diary (2004) - marketing
Rules of Dating (2005) - trailer
Sad Movie (2005) - marketing
Voice of a Murderer (2007) - production dept
Couples (2011) - production dept
Snowpiercer (2013) - visual effects
The Beauty Inside (2015) - director, visual effects, poster

Music video 
Burn It Up (2017) - director

Awards 
2015 52nd Grand Bell Awards: Best New Director (The Beauty Inside)

References

External links 
 
 
 

1970 births
Living people
South Korean film directors
Place of birth missing (living people)